The 1954 Kansas gubernatorial election was held on November 2, 1954. Republican nominee Fred Hall defeated Democratic nominee George Docking with 52.98% of the vote.

Primary elections
Primary elections were held on August 3, 1954.

Democratic primary

Candidates 

George Docking, businessman
William C. Salome

Results

Republican primary

Candidates
Fred Hall, incumbent Lieutenant Governor
Henry George Templar, former United States Attorney for the District of Kansas
Joe E. Rogers

Results

General election

Candidates
Major party candidates 
Fred Hall, Republican
George Docking, Democratic

Other candidates
Chester A. Roberts, Prohibition
W. W. Tamplin, Socialist

Results

References

1954
Kansas
Gubernatorial